Withington is a civil parish in Shropshire, England.  It contains 15 listed buildings that are recorded in the National Heritage List for England.  Of these, one is listed at Grade II*, the middle of the three grades, and the others are at Grade II, the lowest grade.  The parish contains the village of Withington and the surrounding area.  All but one of the listed buildings are in the village, and most of these are houses, cottages and farmhouses, the earlier of which are timber framed. The other listed buildings are a church, a memorial in the churchyard, and two pumps.


Key

Buildings

References

Citations

Sources

Lists of buildings and structures in Shropshire